Ricardo José Vaz Alves Monteiro (born 7 October 1983), known as Tarantini, is a Portuguese former professional footballer who played as an attacking midfielder, currently assistant manager of F.C. Famalicão.

He spent most of his career with Rio Ave, making 444 competitive appearances including 345 in the Primeira Liga. Earlier, he played 112 games and scored 21 goals in the LigaPro for three other clubs.

Club career
Born in the village of in Gestaçô in Baião, Porto District, Tarantini earned his nickname from his physical resemblance to Argentine footballer Alberto Tarantini. He started playing football with Amarante FC, remaining in the club's youth system for eight years, then made his debut as a senior with S.C. Covilhã in 2002. He alternated between the second and third divisions until 2008, also representing Gondomar S.C. and Portimonense SC.

In summer 2008, Tarantini signed for Rio Ave F.C. of the Primeira Liga, making his debut in the competition on 24 August in a 1–1 home draw against S.L. Benfica (82 minutes played) and finishing his debut season with 20 matches and five starts to help his team to the 12th position.

Tarantini scored his first goal in the top tier of Portuguese football on 10 April 2011, the last in a 6–1 away rout of F.C. Paços de Ferreira. The 2012–13 campaign was the most prolific of his career with six league goals – seven overall – including two in a 2–2 draw at home to reigning champions FC Porto on 29 September.

In 2013–14, Tarantini played 37 total games as the team from Vila do Conde reached the finals of the Taça de Portugal and Taça da Liga, losing both to S.L. Benfica. In the fourth round of the former on 10 November 2013, he opened the scoring in a 4–2 home win over Sertanense F.C. at the Estádio dos Arcos. The following 10 August, in the Supertaça Cândido de Oliveira against the same adversary as the previous finals, he played the full 120 minutes of a goalless draw and took Rio Ave's first attempt in the penalty shootout, saved by Artur Moraes whose team ended victorious.

Tarantini remained a regular in the 2019–20 season, as Rio Ave finished a joint-best fifth and with a record points tally of 55. On 22 February, he made his 400th appearance in a 2–1 win at C.D. Tondela. In May 2021, after the team's relegation, he went up to the fans in tears and asked for forgiveness; he was met with applause and requests to stay with the club, but was ultimately released by the board of directors in July.

In October 2021, shortly after having announced his retirement, the 38-year-old Tarantini joined Ivo Vieira's coaching staff at F.C. Famalicão.

Personal life
Tarantini held a degree and a master's degree in sports science from the University of Beira Interior, which he obtained still as a professional footballer. In November 2017, he released a book A Minha Causa (My Cause) with advice for his fellow professionals on life after retiring from the game.

Club statistics

References

External links

1983 births
Living people
People from Baião, Portugal
Sportspeople from Porto District
Portuguese footballers
Association football midfielders
Primeira Liga players
Liga Portugal 2 players
Segunda Divisão players
Amarante F.C. players
S.C. Covilhã players
Gondomar S.C. players
Portimonense S.C. players
Rio Ave F.C. players